Van Buren County School District may refer to:
 Van Buren County Community School District - Iowa
 Van Buren County Schools - Tennessee